Ghulam-Sarwar Yousof (21 November 1939 – 10 November 2022) was a Malaysian academic and writer. He was an expert in traditional Malay and South-East Asian theatre as well as one of the leading writers of Malaysian English Literature.

Early years and education
Ghulam-Sarwar Yousof was the eldest of five children of Punjabi Muslim parents. He completed his primary and secondary education at King Edward VII School in the beautiful lake-town of Taiping, before proceeding to the newly established campus of the University of Malaya in Kuala Lumpur, where he majored in English, with a minor in Islamic Studies. Ghulam-Sarwar also studied Sanskrit and French, continuing his early interest in languages which included Urdu, Punjabi and Tamil. In later years he was to delve into Malay, Hokkien, Tagalog as well as Persian.   
Ghulam-Sarwar’s  plans to study  for a postgraduate degree at the University of Malaya did not materialise due to family considerations as well as his particular interest to work on Asian rather than western literature. He served as a temporary teacher at the Methodist Boys’ School in Penang while also helping in his family textiles business and rubber estate. With the establishment in 1969 of University of Penang (later renamed Science University of Malaya, locally Universiti Sains Malaysia or USM), he was invited in the following year to set up the first performing arts programme in the country at that university.

Given the opportunity to go for further studies in theatre under the university’s Academic Staff Training Scheme, Ghulam-Sarwar went to Honolulu in 1972 on a grant from the East-West Centre, entering directly into the PhD programme of the University of Hawaiʻi Department of Drama and Theatre. Following research trips to the University of Michigan at Ann Arbor, Michigan, an extended tour of several European and Asian countries as well as fieldwork in the province of Kelantan in Malaysia, Ghulam-Sarwar visited Australia at the invitation of the South Australian government to look at theatre facilities in Adelaide, with a view to enhancing cultural exchange between the twin cities of Adelaide and Georgetown, Penang. He obtained his PhD in 1976 with a dissertation on the ancient mak yong dance theatre under the supervision of the renowned Asian theatre scholar, James R Brandon. Ghulam-Sarwar’s was to be the world’s first ever doctorate on any of the Malay performing arts.

Involvement in theatre and literature
Returning to USM in 1976, Ghulam-Sarwar Yousof served as  Head of the Performing Arts programme and Associate Professor, until 1995. Following several years of freelance teaching as well as research, mainly in Southeast Asia, but also in India, he joined the Cultural Centre of the University of Malaya (UMCC) as Professor in theatre studies. In 2009 Ghulam-Sarwar joined the English Department of the International Islamic University of Malaysia (IIUM) in Kuala Lumpur as Senior Academic Fellow, while concurrently continuing to serve as Expert at the UMCC where he supervised postgraduate students in Theatre as well as Visual Arts. In July 2014, leaving IIUM, he returned to UMCC. Ghulam-Sarwar has served as visiting professor and guest lecturer at universities in Asia, Australia as well as Europe in addition to participating in numerous conferences involving diverse disciplines in Asian arts and culture. Although not actively involved as a theatre practitioner, Ghulam-Sarwar has, throughout the years, participated actively in various theatre and cultural programmes involving international troupes during the annual Festival of Penang, as well as on preservation and conservation of traditional heritage.

Research
Ghulam-Sarwar Yousof carved for himself a niche as one of the world’s leading researchers on traditional Southeast Asian theatre, as well as related subjects such as Asian epics, folk traditions of the arts and shamanic rituals through his unstinting forays into the field in almost all countries of the region.

Apart from traditional Asian theatre, his major research interests include Asian literatures, folklore studies, as well as South- and Southeast Asian cultures, comparative religion, mythology and, Sufism. In ethnographic and folklore studies he has explored Malay-Indonesian mythology and folk literature, Malay concepts of the soul (semangat), and angin as well as their place in healing processes involving traditional theatre. It is through his pioneering research and sustained academic writing that Ghulam-Sarwar has made his greatest contributions to learning.  
For the first time ever, through his efforts courses in traditional Malay and Southeast Asian genres such as the shadow play (wayang kulit), the mak yong dance theatre and bangsawan were offered in any Malaysian university. In his teaching of traditional theatre he successfully involved puppeteers, actors, dancers as well as musicians. These practices as well as the curricula he first developed at USM were to serve as models for subsequent programmes in performing arts in several academic institutions.

Beyond his own country, his research efforts in Indonesia, the Philippines, mainland Southeast Asia, and India have provided new insights into relationships between particular shared genres such as the shadow play. His unstinting field research over several decades has generated a considerable amount of data, documentation and writing for which Ghulam-Sarwar has become justifiably well-known.

Creative writing
When it comes to creative writing Ghulam-Sarwar Yousof, who worked with poetry, drama as well as short stories, emerged as one of Malaysia’s most prolific and original authors in the English language.

His poetry has been published in several journals in various countries. He published three collections of verse: Performed Memories (1982), Songs for Shooting Stars: Mystical Verse (2011) and Transient Moments (2012).

While a small number of Ghulam-Sarwar’s poems explore ordinary everyday life, most of his verse reflects a fascination with what he calls alternative realities, and his encounters with them. Influences from a whole range of western and eastern poets as well as mysticism, particularly Sufism are evident in his work. Critics have compared his nature mysticism to William Wordsworth’s: “in spite of the huge boundaries of time and space, both Ghulam Sarwar’s contemporary poetry and Wordsworth’s poems from the Romantic era have a very similar and strong affinity with nature.”

Thus, in many ways, his verse is unique, differing considerably in content, style, meaning and intention from that of most Malaysian poets. Ghulam-Sarwar attributes these features in his verse to his personal background and his cultural heritage from both the Near East and South Asia, something that he has been keenly aware of and fascinated with from his teens.   
Ghulam-Sarwar Yousof has written three full-length plays: Halfway Road, Penang,   The Trial of Hang Tuah the Great and Suvarna Padma: The Golden Lotus in addition to several shorter pieces. Each of his plays is controversial in its own way due to the issues explored. Among his twenty or so short stories several have been published. Notable ones include “Lottery Ticket”, “Tok Dalang”, “Dewi Ratnasari” and “Meditations on a Charpoy”. Like his poetry, Ghulam-Sarwar’s  short stories as well as his plays are embedded in traditional Asian culture, mythology as well as religious experience. His short fiction, in particular, explores little known facets of Malaysian life through such characters as the traditional shadow puppeteer (dalang) or members of minority communities such as Punjabi Muslims, Sikhs or Tamil Muslims within the complex and  diverse fabric of Malaysian society.

Translations
Ghulam-Sarwar Yousof worked on translations of poetry from Urdu into English, with special focus on the lyrical ghazal form, and well as selected examples of modern verse. In collaboration with others he also worked on translations of Persian poetry into English.

UNESCO project
Ghulam-Sarwar Yousof prepared the official nomination papers on behalf of the Malaysian Ministry of Culture for submission to UNESCO to gain recognition for the mak yong dance theatre of Malaysia as an Item of the Oral and Intangible Heritage of Humanity in the year 2005.

Other activities
Ghulam-Sarwar Yousof was involved in numerous cultural organisations in Malaysia as well as internationally over five decades. He was Theatre Consultant for Mindanao State University- Iligan Institute of Technology, Iligan City, Philippines, 1984;  Malaysia’s  representative (Governor) on the Board of Governors, Asia Europe Foundation (1999-2005); Founding Member of the ASEAN Puppetry Association (APA), established in 2006, and Presidium Chairman of APA for the entire Southeast Asian region (2011–2014).

Personal life and death
Yousof died on 10 November 2022, at the age of 82.

Awards
Academic awards

 East-West Centre Grant for a Doctoral Programme at the Department of Drama and Theatre, University of Hawaii, Honolulu, USA. September 1972 to September 1976.
 Universiti Sains Malaysia Academic Staff Training Scheme (ASTS) Fellowship for a Doctoral Programme at the Department of Drama and Theatre, University of Hawaii, Honolulu, USA. September 1972 to September 1977.
 Universiti Sains Malaysia, Penang, Research Grants for Research, Field Work and Documentation of Traditional Malay Theatre Genres. 1978 to 1994.
 Institute of Southeast Asian Studies, Singapore, Research Grant. June 1983 – June 1984.
 Southeast Asian Studies Programme (SEASP), Institute of Southeast Asian Studies, Singapore, teaching and Research Exchange Fellowships Award. June 1983 to March 1984.
 Southeast Asian Studies Programme (SEASP), Institute of Southeast Asian Studies, Singapore, Cross-Cultural Research and Writing Award. June 1983 to March 1984.

Awards of recognition
Tokoh Maal-Hijrah (Persatuan Melayu Pulau Pinang), 2001.
International Award for Outstanding Contribution for Humanity, Peace, Culture and Education (Forum for Culture and Human Development, Bangladesh), 2001.
Dove Award for Excellence in Poetry awarded (Poetry Day Australia), 2001.
Darjah Setia Pangkuan Negeri (DSPN), which carries the title of Dato’ awarded by the Tuan Yang Terutama Yang DiPertua Negeri Pulau Pinang (Governor of Penang), 2008.
Boh Cameronian Lifetime Achievement Award (Kakiseni Malaysia), 2008.

Selected publications
For a complete listing of Ghulam-Sarwar Yousof’s academic papers see gsyousof.com

Academic Books
 Ceremonial and Decorative Crafts of Penang. Penang: State Museum, 1986. 
 Bibliography of Traditional Theatre in Southeast Asia. Singapore: Institute of Southeast Asian Studies, 1991. 
 Panggung Semar: Aspects of Traditional Malay Theatre. Kuala Lumpur: Tempo Publishing (M) Sdn. Bhd., 1992. 
 Dictionary of Traditional Southeast Asian Theatre. Kuala Lumpur: Oxford University Press, 1994. 
 Angin Wayang: Biography of a Master Puppeteer. Kuala Lumpur: Ministry of Culture, Arts and Tourism, 1997. 
 Angin Wayang: Biografi Seorang Dalang yang unggul. Kuala Lumpur: Ministry of Culture, Arts and Tourism, 1997. 
 The Malay Shadow Play: An Introduction. Penang: The Asian Centre, 1997. 
 Reflections on Asian-European Epics. (Editor: Ghulam-Sarwar Yousof). Singapore: Editions Didier Millet, Archipelago Press, 2004. 
 Panggung Inu: Aspects of Traditional Malay Theatre. Singapore: National University of Singapore Cultural centre, 2004. 
 Encyclopedia of Malaysia. Vol 8, Performing Arts. Editor: Ghulam-Sarwar Yousof). Singapore: Archipelago Press. Editions Didier Millet, 2004. 
 Heritage of ASEAN Puppetry. Jakarta: Sena Wangi, 2013.  
 Issues in Traditional Malaysian Culture: Singapore: Strafford, 2013; Partridge 2014.   
 Selected Papers on Traditional Malay Theatre. (Tokoh Melayu Series). Kuala Lumpur, 2014.  
 Puppetry for all Times: Papers presented at the Bali Seminar on Puppetry in 2013.  Bali, Indonesia: House of Masks and Puppets (Rumah Topeng) and Partridge, Singapore, 2014.
 Indian and South East Asian Themes in Traditional Theatre. Bengaluru India: Pragati Graphics, 2015.
 Mak Yong: World Heritage Theatre. Penang, Malaysia: Areca Books, 2019.
Monographs

 Muslim Festivals: Essence and Observance. Islamic Information Centre, Malayan Pakistani League, Penang, 1989. 
 Traditional Theatre in Southeast Asia: An Introduction. Penang: Cultural Centre, Universiti Sains Malaysia, 1993. Monographs on Southeast Asian Cultures series. 
 Mak Yong Theatre of Kelantan, Malaysia: An Introduction. Kuala Lumpur: The Asian Cultural Heritage Centre Berhad, 2011.

Literary Books
 
 Perfumed Memories. Singapore: Graham Brash Pte Ltd., 1982.  
 Mirror of a Hundred Hues: A Miscellany. Penang: The Asian Cultural Heritage     Centre, 2001. 
 Halfway Road, Penang. Penang. Teks Publishing Company, (1982). Reprinted by The Asian Cultural Heritage Centre, Penang, 2002.
 Jalan Sekerat, Pulau Pinang. Penang: Teks Publishing Company (1982).  
 Songs for Shooting Stars: Mystical Verse. Pittsburgh, PA 15222, USA: Lauriat Press, 2011. 
 Transient Moments: Selected Poems. Kuala Lumpur: The Asian Centre, 2012.  
 The Trial of Hang Tuah the Great. Singapore: Partridge, 2014.  
 Tok Dalang and Stories of Other Malaysians. Singapore: Partridge, 2014.   
 The Asian Centre Anthology of Malaysian Poetry in English. (Edited by Ghulam-Sarwar Yousof). Singapore: Partridge, 2014.
 Suvarna-Padma, The Golden Lotus. Singapore: Partridge, 2015.
 Sacred Rain. Singapore: Partridge, 2015.

General Book
 
 One Hundred and One Thing Malay. Singapore: Partridge, 2015.

Later projects
Ghulam-Sarwar Yousof’s Later Research and Writing Projects include:
 Translations of Ghazals from the Urdu to English 
 Dictionary of Traditional Southeast Asian Theatre (Enlarged 2nd edition) 
 Mak Yong: World Heritage Theatre 
 Ramayana Characters in the Malaysian Shadow Play  
 Theatre, Ritual and Healing in Kelantan, Malaysia 
 Theories of Traditional Asian Theatre 
 One Hundred and One Things Malay 
 Traditional Theatre in Muslim Societies

References

1939 births
2022 deaths
Academic staff of Universiti Sains Malaysia
Malaysian writers
Malaysian activists
Malaysian Muslims
Malaysian people of Punjabi descent
Universiti Sains Malaysia alumni
University of Hawaiʻi at Mānoa alumni
Academic staff of the International Islamic University Malaysia